Monty Henson, sometimes known as Hawkeye Henson (born October 22, 1953), is a three-time Professional Rodeo Cowboys Association (PRCA) world champion saddle bronc rider.

He was born in Farmersville near Dallas, Texas. He grew up with childhood friend, PRCA bull riding champion, and fellow hall of famer Don Gay. During his rodeo career he won 3 world titles in 1975, 1976, and again in 1982. He won the average at the National Finals Rodeo (NFR) 4 times, and qualified for the NFR 14 times. He won or placed at almost every major rodeo in the US as well going to rodeos in Europe and Japan.

He was quoted as saying, "I’m a cowboy. That’s the best thing anybody could say about me. If I could have that on my tombstone – Here lies Hawkeye, a cowboy – then I can die a happy man." In 1994, he was inducted in the Prorodeo Hall of Fame in Colorado Springs, Colorado. In 2002, Hawkeye was inducted into the Texas Cowboy Hall of Fame located in the Fort Worth Stockyards in Fort Worth, Texas. The museum features many of his personal items from his rodeo career.
He has appeared in numerous television programs and films. In 2004, he was cast as Hawkeye in four episodes of the HBO series Deadwood alongside Ian McShane, Timothy Olyphant, and Molly Parker.  He is also a country music entertainer and rodeo promoter.

Honors 
 2006 Cheyenne Frontier Days Hall of Fame
 2004 Texas Rodeo Cowboy Hall of Fame
 2003 Texas Cowboy Hall of Fame
 2003 Cowboy Capital Walk of FameCowboy Capital Walk of Fame
 1994 ProRodeo Hall of Fame
 1983 Calgary Stampede Guy Weadick Award

References

1953 births
Living people
Musicians from Dallas
Sportspeople from Dallas
American male film actors
American male television actors
American country singer-songwriters
Country musicians from Texas
Male actors from Dallas
Singer-songwriters from Texas
ProRodeo Hall of Fame inductees
Saddle bronc riders